Claire Dautherives (born 5 September 1982 in Saint-Jean-de-Maurienne) is an alpine skier from France.  She competed for France at the 2010 Winter Olympics. She failed to finish in the slalom, her only event at the games. She has one top ten place on the World Cup, an eighth-place finish in the slalom at Lienz, Austria in 2007.

References

External links
 
 
 
 
 

1982 births
Living people
French female alpine skiers
Olympic alpine skiers of France
Alpine skiers at the 2010 Winter Olympics
People from Saint-Jean-de-Maurienne
Sportspeople from Savoie